St Saviour's Church, Leicester is a Grade II* listed former parish church in the Church of England in Leicester, Leicestershire.

History

The foundation stone was laid on 7 June 1875. The church was the gift of the Rev Frederick George Burnaby, formerly rector of Barkestone-le-Vale in the Vale of Belvoir. It was designed in the 13th century Early English style by the architect Sir George Gilbert Scott. The contractors were Messrs Osborne Brothers and the clerk-of-works was a Mr G. W. Wood. The church was consecrated on 21 June 1877 by the Bishop of Peterborough.

Parish
The church is in a joint parish known as the Presentation of Christ, Leicester, with:
St Peter's Church, Leicester
St Barnabas' Church, New Humberstone (now closed).

Organ

The pipe organ was built by Stephen Taylor & Son in 1878. A specification of the organ can be found on the National Pipe Organ Register.

References

Leicester, St Saviour
Grade II* listed churches in Leicestershire
Churches completed in 1877
19th-century Church of England church buildings
1877 establishments in England